Gala Fairydean Rovers Football Club are a Scottish association football club based in the town of Galashiels in the Scottish Borders. At the same time the club changed its name to Gala Fairydean Rovers, following a merger between Gala Fairydean and Gala Rovers. The club plays its home matches at Netherdale in Galashiels.

Gala Fairydean won the East of Scotland Football League eight times and finished runners-up on seven occasions. The club reached 15 Scottish Qualifying Cup South finals, winning it 11 times, before the competition was abolished in 2007. Gala Fairydean Rovers qualify automatically for the Scottish Cup as a member of the Scottish Football Association (SFA). The best performance by the club was reaching the third round, done on five occasions. Gala Rovers won the Border Amateur Football League 13 times.

History

Gala Fairydean Rovers was first formed in 1894. In 1907 the club was separated into two teams, known as Gala Fairydean and Gala Rovers. The first Gala Rovers was the reserve team of Gala Fairydean. Both clubs ceased operations in 1914 due to the outbreak of the First World War and the consequent loss of male population in Galashiels. Gala Fairydean resumed in 1919, after the war had ended, and was a founder member of the East of Scotland Football League in 1923.

Gala Rovers were only reformed in 1947 and joined the Border Amateur League. Although the two clubs were separate, they were closely linked through operations such as a joint lottery. Although Gala Fairydean were a semi-professional club and needed funds to pay players, Gala Rovers were amateur and could save some of the funds generated. This helped to fund construction of the 1960s main stand at Netherdale. Gala Fairydean applied to join the Scottish Football League in 1966, 1994, 2000 and 2002, but were unsuccessful on each occasion.

The two clubs merged to form Gala Fairydean Rovers in 2013. The club was admitted into the new Lowland Football League in 2013.

Stadium

Gala Fairydean first played its home matches at Eastlands Park in Galashiels between 1909 and 1913, before moving to Mossilee for a spell until the 1920s. The club moved back to Eastlands, and stayed until 1929, when Netherdale was opened. Netherdale has been the club's home since 1929 and is located in the south-east of Galashiels. The ground's main spectator stand was designed by architect Peter Womersley, alongside engineers Ove Arup and built between 1963 and 1965. The stand has a capacity for 750 spectators and the ground as a whole up to 4,000. The cantilevered concrete structure is protected as a Category A listed building. The club bought 300 seats from Newcastle United's St James' Park stadium when it was refurbished, but were replaced in 2006 by wooden benches.

Current squad
As of 13 January 2023

On loan

Season-by-season record

Lowland League

† Season curtailed due to the COVID-19 pandemic.

Honours

League
Eastern League:
Winners (1): 1921–22
East of Scotland League (1923 to 1987) and East of Scotland Premier Division (after 1987):
Winners (8): 1960–61, 1961–62, 1963–64, 1964–65, 1965–66, 1968–69, 1988–89, 1990–91
Runners-up (7): 1925–26, 1981–82, 1982–83, 1983–84, 1985–86, 1994–95, 1995–96
East of Scotland First Division (after 1987):
Runners-up (1): 1999–00

Cup
Scottish Qualifying Cup South:
Winners (11): 1961, 1965, 1966, 1978, 1982, 1983, 1984, 1985, 1987, 1989, 1991
Runners-up (4): 1981, 1988, 1992, 1996
King Cup: 
Winners (11): 1911–12, 1912–13, 1914–15, 1929–30, 1946–47, 1960–61, 1964–65, 1965–66, 1968–69, 1971–72, 1988–89
East of Scotland Qualifying Cup:
Winners (10): 1926–27, 1946–47, 1961–62, 1965–66, 1969–70, 1970–71, 1986–87, 1987–88, 1990–91, 1994–95
East of Scotland City Cup: 
Winners (2): 1960–61, 1987–88
East of Scotland League Cup: 
Winners (2): 1968–69, 1993–94

Gala Rovers AFC

BAFA honours

 Winners (13): 1951, 1953, 1954, 1959, 1964, 1978, 1987, 1996, 2000, 2001, 2002, 2004, 2013 
B Division 
 Winners (1): 1995  
South Cup  
 Winners (4):1954, 1963, 1964, 2007  
Border Cup  
 Winners (6): 1963, 1968, 1996, 2000, 2002, 2003  
Beveridge Cup  
 Winners (6): 1954, 1967, 1978, 1996, 2003, 2013  
Wright Cup  
 Winners (4):1963, 1966, 1985, 1995  
Walls Cup  
 Winners (1): 1995  
Waddel Cup  
 Winners (3): 1988, 2001, 2003  
Dudley Cup  
 Winners (4): 1949, 1950, 1953, 2013

References

General
Dean Unveil Dream Team
Fairydean legend Notman slams Youth Coaching
Row over Gala player Gass explodes
Latest Gala Fairydean Committee unveiled

External links
Official website
Gala Fairydean at Soccerbase

 
Association football clubs established in 2013
Football clubs in Scotland
2013 establishments in Scotland
East of Scotland Football League teams
Lowland Football League teams
Galashiels
Football clubs in the Scottish Borders